Cerca-la-Source is an arrondissement (district) in the Centre department of Haiti. As of 2015, the population was 119,756 inhabitants. Postal codes in the Cerca-la-Source Arrondissement start with the number 54.

The arondissement consists of the following communes:
 Cerca-la-Source
 Thomassique

References

Arrondissements of Haiti
Centre (department)